Wenanty Fuhl (born 2 December 1960, in Ruda Śląska) is a retired Polish football player.

References

External links
 
 

1960 births
Living people
Sportspeople from Ruda Śląska
Polish footballers
Wiener Sport-Club players
1. FC Nürnberg players
1. FC Saarbrücken players
FC 08 Homburg players
Bundesliga players
2. Bundesliga players
Szombierki Bytom players
Association football defenders
Association football midfielders
TSV Havelse players
20th-century Polish people